The Mann House is a historic house at 422 Forrest Street in Forrest City, Arkansas. Designed by Charles L. Thompson and built in 1913, it is one of the firm's finest examples of Colonial Revival architecture.  The front facade features an imposing Greek temple portico with two-story Ionic columns supporting a fully pedimented gable with dentil molding. The main entrance, sheltered by this portico, is flanked by sidelight windows and topped by a fanlight transom with diamond-pattern lights.

The house was listed on the National Register of Historic Places in 1982.

See also
National Register of Historic Places listings in St. Francis County, Arkansas

References

Houses on the National Register of Historic Places in Arkansas
Colonial Revival architecture in Arkansas
Houses in St. Francis County, Arkansas
National Register of Historic Places in St. Francis County, Arkansas
Forrest City, Arkansas
1913 establishments in Arkansas
Houses completed in 1913